Voices: WWE The Music, Vol. 9 is a compilation album released by World Wrestling Entertainment (WWE) in the United States and Canada on January 27, 2009, Australia on January 24 and in the United Kingdom on April 13, 2009. The album was originally announced to be a three-CD set featuring new music by Jim Johnston and alternate mixes of older material from the past 25 years to commemorate the WrestleMania 25th anniversary. However, the album is now a single disc of original theme music, with a bonus disc containing a selection of past theme music.

The working title for the album was WWE Anthology II and was originally set to be the sequel to WWE's 2002 album WWE Anthology. The album reached a peak at number 11 on the Billboard 200 chart.

It was re-released on iTunes on January 26, 2014, with the original track list and a remixed version of Jake "The Snake" Roberts entrance theme.

Track listing 
All songs are composed, written and produced by Jim Johnston except "What's Up?", written and composed by Ron Killings (R-Truth).

† The subject as seen in the official track listing. The subject of the song may differ from what is currently used in WWE.

A two-disc, deluxe edition of Vol. 9 is available exclusively at Best Buy stores which includes the Legends of WWE CD, featuring:

* These tracks are also included as bonus tracks on the regular CD release in the UK. Numbered 14, 15 and 16 respectively.

iTunes re-release track listing 
All songs are composed, written and produced by Jim Johnston except "What's Up?", written and composed by Ron Killings (R-Truth).

Release history

See also 

Music in professional wrestling

References 

2009 compilation albums
2009 soundtrack albums
Columbia Records compilation albums
WWE albums